The 2015 Grand Prix Zagreb Open, was a wrestling event held in Zagreb, Croatia between 21–22 February 2015.

Medal table

Team ranking

Greco-Roman

Participating nations

References 

Grand Prix Zagreb Open
Grand Prix Zagreb Open
International wrestling competitions hosted by Croatia
Sport in Zagreb
Wrestling in Croatia
Grand Prix Zagreb Open